The Dumbarton Football Stadium, commonly known as The Rock, and currently named The moreroom.com Stadium for sponsorship purposes is a stadium in Dumbarton, Scotland, used mostly for football matches; it is the home ground of Dumbarton Football Club. It was built on part of the site formerly occupied by Denny's shipyard. The stadium is 5–10 minutes walk from Dumbarton East railway station on the North Clyde Line. Dumbarton have the third smallest stadium in the SPFL.

History
The stadium has just one stand, officially opened on Saturday 2 December 2000 prior to the visit of Elgin City; a match which ended 3–0 to the Sons. It is nicknamed The Rock by fans, as it is adjacent to Dumbarton Castle. Open areas ring the three sides without stands.

The Scotland international team have also used the stadium for training purposes before playing home matches. Celtic have used the stadium for UEFA Youth League home games.

Aside from football the stadium also hosts many other events; wedding receptions, conferences & parties.

Names
The original name of the stadium, Strathclyde Homes Stadium, changed after the stadium sponsor, Strathclyde Homes, went into receivership in September 2011. On 18 February 2012, the stadium was officially renamed Dumbarton Football Stadium, sponsored by DL Cameron. It was renamed again, just five months later on 20 July 2012, The Bet Butler Stadium. On 9 July 2015, the stadium was unveiled as the Cheaper Insurance Direct Stadium, after fan Alex Couper and his company took over the sponsorship. At the end of the 2016–17 season the name reverted to Dumbarton Football Stadium. In July 2017 the club agreed a deal with local radio station Your Radio, which would see the stadium known as 'The YOUR Radio 103FM Stadium' for at least the next two years. That deal was cancelled in May 2018 with Your Radio facing an uncertain future, with C&G Systems agreeing a three-year deal a week later. In September 2021 the housing specialists moreroom agreed a deal with the club to be the sponsors for this season and change the name of the stadium to the moreroom.com stadium

See also
 Scottish stadium moves

References

Dumbarton F.C.
Dumbarton
Football venues in Scotland
Sports venues in West Dunbartonshire
Scottish Football League venues
Scottish Professional Football League venues
Sports venues completed in 2000